John Peel's Record Box is a documentary film made by Elaine Shepherd, released on 14 November 2005 on Channel 4. It was nominated for Primetime Emmy Award.



Contents 
The box contains a small private collection of the British radio DJ John Peel who died in 2004 at the age of 65. Peel's main archive contained more than 100,000 vinyl records and CDs. This smaller collection is 143 singles, some of them doublettes, stored in a wooden box representing some of his favourites. According to the documentary, there are no singles by Peel's favourite group, The Fall, because he kept them in a separate box.

The film features interviews with John's wife Sheila Ravenscroft, radio DJs and artists including Mary Anne Hobbs, Sir Elton John, Ronnie Wood, Roger Daltrey, Feargal Sharkey, Jack White, Michael Palin and Miki Berenyi.

Inside John Peel's Record Box

External links
 
 
 
 
 

2005 television films
2005 films
2005 documentary films
Channel 4 documentaries
Documentary films about rock music and musicians
Record collecting
John Peel
British documentary films
2000s British films